Domodon is a genus of hoverfly from South America and Central America containing five species.

Species
D. caxiuana Carvalho-Filho, Martins, Souza & Reemer, 2019 – Brazil, Ecuador, French Guiana
D. inaculeatus Carvalho-Filho, Martins, Souza & Reemer, 2019 – Brazil, French Guiana
D. peperpotensis Reemer, 2014 – Suriname, French Guiana
D. sensibilis Carvalho-Filho, Martins, Souza & Reemer, 2019 – Costa Rica
D. zodiacus Reemer, 2013 – Suriname

References

Hoverfly genera
Microdontinae
Diptera of North America
Diptera of South America